"Love Is a Stranger" is a song by the British pop duo Eurythmics. Originally released in late 1982, the single was commercially unsuccessful, but it was re-released in 1983, reaching the UK top 10. The single was re-released again in 1991, to promote Eurythmics' Greatest Hits album.

Critical reception
Cash Box said that "the commanding vocals of Annie Lennox and hazy, electronically inflected backing combine to make 'Love Is a Stranger' a challenging yet already familiar sound." Stereogum and The Guardian both ranked the song number two on their lists of the greatest Annie Lennox songs.

Commercial performance
Originally released in November 1982 in the United Kingdom, "Love Is a Stranger" reached number 54 on the UK Singles Chart. Following the huge success of "Sweet Dreams (Are Made of This)" the following year, the song was re-released and reached number six in April 1983. In the United States, the song was the second single from the Sweet Dreams (Are Made of This) album. The single was released just as the album title track reached number one, entering the Billboard Hot 100 at number 81 in September 1983 and peaking at number 23 in November of that year. The song spent 13 weeks on the chart.

Music video
The single release was accompanied by a music video directed by Mike Brady, in which Stewart acts as chauffeur for Lennox, who plays the role of a high-class prostitute. Lennox removes a curly blonde wig to reveal close-cropped, red hair, though in the music video her hair was slicked back rather than being a buzz cut as seen in the subsequent music video, "Sweet Dreams (Are Made of This)". This caused minor controversy in the USA, as some people mistakenly thought Lennox was a male cross-dresser.

Track listings
7-inch single
A. "Love Is a Stranger" (LP version) – 3:43
B. "Monkey Monkey" (Non-LP track) – 5:20

12-inch single
A1. "Love Is a Stranger" (LP version) – 3:43
B1. "Let's Just Close Our Eyes" (Non-LP track) – 4:19
B2. "Monkey Monkey" (Non-LP track) – 5:20

"Let's Just Close Our Eyes" is a newly recorded version of "The Walk" with a more synth-oriented instrumentation.

7-inch single (1991 reissue)
A. "Love Is A Stranger" (LP version) – 3:43
B. "Julia" (Edit) – 4:05

12-inch single (1991 reissue)
A1. "Love Is A Stranger" (The Obsession Remix) 6:32
A2. "Love Is A Stranger" (J.C. Meets The Obsessor) – 6:34
B1. "Love Is A Stranger" (Cold Cut Remix) – 7:17
B2. "Love Is A Stranger" (The Obsession Instrumental) – 6:07
B3. "Love Is A Stranger" (LP version) – 3:43

CD single (1991 reissue)
"Love Is A Stranger" (LP version) – 3:43  
"There Must Be An Angel (Playing With My Heart)" – 5:23  
"Julia" (Edit) – 4:05  
"Love Is A Stranger" (The Obsession Remix) – 6:30

Personnel

Eurythmics
Annie Lennox – lead vocals, keyboards, synthesisers
David A. Stewart – keyboards, synthesisers, programming, backing vocals

Additional personnel
Robert Crash – e-drums, synthesiser, robotic vocals
Adam Williams – synthesiser
Reynard Falconer – synthesisers

Charts

Weekly charts

Year-end charts

References

External links
  

1982 songs
1982 singles
Eurythmics songs
RCA Records singles
Songs written by Annie Lennox
Songs written by David A. Stewart
Song recordings produced by Dave Stewart (musician and producer)